Scott Creek Bridge-North, Maryland and Pennsylvania Railroad is a historic railroad bridge in Peach Bottom Township, York County, Pennsylvania.  It was built about 1909. The girder bridge with stone abutments was built by the Maryland and Pennsylvania Railroad and crosses Scott Creek.

It was added to the National Register of Historic Places in 1995.

References

Railroad bridges on the National Register of Historic Places in Pennsylvania
Bridges completed in 1909
Bridges in York County, Pennsylvania
National Register of Historic Places in York County, Pennsylvania
Girder bridges in the United States